Anagha is an Indian model and actress who works in Malayalam, Tamil and Telugu films. She made her acting debut with the Malayalam movie Rakshadhikari Baiju Oppu (2017). She won "SIIMA Best Debutant Actress (Tamil)" award for her performance in Natpe Thunai (2019).

She has acted in successful films such as  Rakshadhikari Baiju Oppu (2017), Parava (2017), Natpe Thunai (2019), Guna 369 (2019) and Bheeshma Parvam (2022).

Early life
Anagha was born in Kozhikode, Kerala. Anagha's father Kuttikrishnan and mother Leela are retired teachers. She completed her primary schooling at Sree Gokulam Public School, Calicut. Anagha did her B.Tech. at College of Engineering Chengannur at Chengannur  and Completed M.Tech. at (NIELIT) National Institute of Electronics and Information Technology, Calicut.

Filmography

Music Videos

Discography

Awards & nominations

References

External links

Living people
Indian film actresses
Actresses in Tamil cinema
Actresses in Malayalam cinema
Actresses in Telugu cinema
Actresses from Kerala
Year of birth missing (living people)